Bombette Martin (born 1 June 2006) is a British-American skateboarder. She won the women's park event at the 2021 GB Skateboard Championships. Martin and Sky Brown were selected to represent Great Britain in skateboarding at the 2020 Summer Olympics. She became the first skateboarder to ever compete in a park event in the Olympic Games.

Martin was born and lives in New York City, though she spent much of her childhood in her father’s home city of Birmingham, England, and holds dual citizenship in the United Kingdom and the United States. About joining Team GB rather than Team USA for the 2020 Olympics, Martin said, "I like to make the joke that I'm half a New Yorker, and 3/4ths a Brummie! I spent so much of my childhood in Birmingham because my dad is British, so I guess it didn't really cross my mind, or my family's mind, to even try and compete for America. We just decided to try and go for Great Britain and it's worked out."

She was named after her father, Jon "Bomber" Martin, an amateur boxer.

In 2021, Bombette and her brother and fellow skateboarder, Kayo Martin, were featured in a promotional campaign for Gap Inc.

References

External links
 
 Bombette Martin at The Boardr

2006 births
Living people
British skateboarders
American skateboarders
Female skateboarders
British people of American descent
American people of English descent
Olympic skateboarders of Great Britain
Skateboarders at the 2020 Summer Olympics
Sportspeople from Manhattan